Hafiz Osman (born 15 February 1984) is a former professional footballer who played in the S.League and the Singapore national football team.

Club career
The natural right-back played in the S-League for  Singapore Armed Forces, Tanjong Pagar United and Geylang International FC.

International career
He made his debut for the Singapore national team on 8 January 2007 against Philippines. Osman played 9 times for the Singapore national football team.

He was part of the Singapore Under-23 team that took part in the 2007 Southeast Asian Games in Korat, Thailand that won a bronze medal.

Honours

Club
Singapore Armed Forces
S.League: 2006, 2007, 2008, 2009
Singapore Cup: 2007, 2008

International
Singapore
AFF Championship: 2007
Southeast Asian Games: Bronze Medal - 2007

References

External links
 

Living people
Singaporean footballers
Singapore international footballers
Tanjong Pagar United FC players
1984 births
Warriors FC players
Association football defenders
Singapore Premier League players
Footballers at the 2006 Asian Games
Southeast Asian Games bronze medalists for Singapore
Southeast Asian Games medalists in football
Competitors at the 2007 Southeast Asian Games
Asian Games competitors for Singapore